Gol Gonjan (also Romanized as Gol Gonjān; also known as Galeh Gonjān and Galleh Gonjān) is a village in Darreh Kayad Rural District, Sardasht District, Dezful County, Khuzestan Province, Iran. At the 2006 census, its population was 42, in 8 families.

References 

Populated places in Dezful County